Aspergillus niveus is a species of fungus in the genus Aspergillus. It is from the Terrei section. The species was first described in 1929. It has been reported to cause pulmonary aspergillosis. It has been reported to produce aszonalenine, butyrolactones, citrinin, and gregatins.

Growth and morphology

A. niveus has been cultivated on both Czapek yeast extract agar (CYA) plates and Malt Extract Agar Oxoid® (MEAOX) plates. The growth morphology of the colonies can be seen in the pictures below.

References 

niveus
Fungi described in 1929